General elections were held in Fiji in July, August and September 1920.

Electoral system
The Legislative Council consisted of 12 official members (eleven civil servants and a British subject not holding public office), seven elected Europeans and two appointed Fijians. The Governor served as President of the Council.

The Europeans were elected from six constituencies; Eastern, Northern, Southern, Suva, Vanua Levu & Taveuni and Western. Voting was restricted to men aged 21 or over who had been born to European parents (or a European father and was able to read, speak and write English) who were British subjects and had been continuously resident in Fiji for 12 months, either owning at least £20 of freehold or leasehold property or having an annual income of at least £120, and were not on the public payroll.

Results

Appointed members
The nominated members were appointed on 15 October; one of the Fijian posts was left unfilled.

Aftermath
A by-election was held for the Vanua Levu and Taveuni seat on 4 October 1922, which was won by William Edmund Willoughby-Tottenham.

References

1920 elections in Oceania
1920 in Fiji
1920
1920 elections in the British Empire